Wheaton Bible Church is an independent megachurch located in West Chicago, Illinois, United States. The church holds $42,560,676 in assets and their annual budget for 2021 is $11,678,000.

History
The church was founded in the 1929. Rob Bugh was called to the church in 1994. Until 2008, the church was located in Wheaton, Illinois, and retained the geographically oriented name when it relocated to a new campus. Alongside First Presbyterian of Wheaton, Wheaton Bible Church split from College Church early in its history.

Ministries
Locally, the church's Puente del Pueblo outreach is the largest social service provider in West Chicago, with offices in the Timber Lake and Main Park apartments offering case management services for families, adult literacy programming, summer programs, and after school programming for children and youth. In addition, the church actively supports hunger ministries, partners with World Relief in refugee resettlement, and hosts an annual Carefest which involves thousands of volunteer service hours at local schools, individual homes, local ministry partners, and other not-for-profits. 
	
It has a large and active ministry to Hispanic residents of the region, with a full offering of Spanish worship services and other common church programs offered by Spanish-speaking ministers. Additionally, the church has partnered with World Relief to provide accommodation and care for Iraqi refugees.

References

External links

Churches in DuPage County, Illinois
Evangelical churches in Illinois
West Chicago, Illinois
Evangelical megachurches in the United States
Megachurches in Illinois